is a former Japanese football player.

Playing career
Mori was born in Ehime Prefecture on August 1, 1980. After graduating from high school, he joined J1 League club Yokohama F. Marinos in 1999. Although he debuted in May 2000, he could hardly play in the match. In 2001, he moved to J2 League club Mito HollyHock on loan. Although he played many matches in early 2001, his opportunity to play decreased from May. In August 2001, he returned to Yokohama F. Marinos. However he could hardly play in the match. In 2003, he moved to Regional Leagues club Gunma FC Horikoshi (later Arte Takasaki). The club was promoted to Japan Football League from 2004. In August 2006, he moved to Regional Leagues club Banditonce Kobe. In 2007, he moved to Regional Leagues club Zweigen Kanazawa. He retired end of 2008 season.

Club statistics

References

External links

1980 births
Living people
Association football people from Ehime Prefecture
Japanese footballers
J1 League players
J2 League players
Japan Football League players
Yokohama F. Marinos players
Mito HollyHock players
Arte Takasaki players
Zweigen Kanazawa players
Association football forwards